John Matoian (born 1949) is a businessman and television industry executive. He was a vice-president of the CBS Entertainment division. He later became the president of Entertainment at Fox Broadcasting in September 1995. He was president at HBO from 1996 to 1999. He received both his B.A. and his J.D. from Duke University.

Matoian is a native of Fresno and is of Armenian descent.

In the 2012 United States Presidential election, John Matoian had made $83,800 worth of contributions to Barack Obama's successful presidential campaign.

In his book Springfield Confidential, Mike Reiss mentions Matoian by name as the Fox executive whose intense hatred of his and Al Jean's animated series The Critic led to its cancellation after a single season on the network.

References

Armenian businesspeople
American business executives
People from Fresno, California
Stanford University alumni
American people of Armenian descent
CBS executives
Fox News people
Presidents of Fox Broadcasting Company Entertainment
HBO people
1949 births
Living people